The  was a women's professional wrestling championship in the Japanese promotion Union Pro Wrestling (UPW) when it was a sub-brand of DDT Pro-Wrestling. Male wrestlers were eligible to compete for the title so long as they wore women's gear for their matches.

Title history

Combined reigns

See also

DDT Pro-Wrestling
Professional wrestling in Japan

References

DDT Pro-Wrestling championships
World professional wrestling championships